Mahamadou Traoré is a Malian professional footballer, who plays as a defender for CS Constantine.

International career
In January 2014, coach Djibril Dramé, invited him to be a part of the Mali squad for the 2014 African Nations Championship. He helped the team to the quarter finals where they lost to Zimbabwe by two goals to one.

References

Living people
Mali international footballers
Malian footballers
CS Constantine players
2014 African Nations Championship players
1994 births
Association football defenders
21st-century Malian people
Mali A' international footballers
2011 African Nations Championship players
Malian expatriate sportspeople in Morocco
Malian expatriate sportspeople in Algeria
Malian expatriate footballers
Expatriate footballers in Algeria
Expatriate footballers in Morocco
Djoliba AC players
Chabab Atlas Khénifra players
Chabab Rif Al Hoceima players